The Penkill Formation is a geologic formation in Scotland. It preserves fossils dating back to the Silurian period.

See also

 List of fossiliferous stratigraphic units in Scotland

References
 

Geologic formations of Scotland
Silurian System of Europe
Silurian Scotland
Silurian southern paleotropical deposits